Tiassa is the thirteenth book in Steven Brust's Vlad Taltos series, set in the fantasy world of Dragaera. It was published in 2011. Following the trend of the series, it is named after one of the Great Houses and features that House as an important element to its plot.

Plot summary
The book is presented in three parts, with a prelude, interludes, and an epilogue.  All three larger sections and some of the smaller ones involve a silver statue of a tiassa, and the character of Khaavren, of the House of the Tiassa, but each tells a distinct story.

The first section, "Tag", tells the story, in the typical Vlad Taltos as first person narrator style, of certain events early in his career as a high-ranking Jhereg.  Vlad is contacted by the Viscount of Adrilhanka, who is a rogue and highwayman, to defeat a scheme by the Empire to track stolen money.

The second section, "Whitecrest", is set much later, after Vlad is on the run from the Jhereg, and follows multiple characters, mainly the Countess of Whitecrest (Khaavren's wife and the Viscount's mother) and Cawti, Vlad's ex-wife.  An impending Jenoine invasion is detected, but it may be a ruse to draw Vlad out.

The third section, "Special Tasks" is the most recent chronologically, and is written in the voice of Paarfi, the fictional author of the Khaavren Romances.  It mainly follows Khaavren himself as he investigates an attempt on Vlad's life.

2011 American novels
Dragaera
2011 fantasy novels
Tor Books books
Novels by Steven Brust